= Andrew Schepard =

Academic background
- Education: City College of New York (BA); Columbia University (MA); Harvard Law School (JD)

Andrew Schepard is an American legal scholar and Sidney and Walter Siben Distinguished Professor of Family Law at Hofstra University. He is a former editor-in-chief of Family Court Review.
